Tournado may refer to the following albums:

Tournado (The All-American Rejects album)
Tournado (Tangerine Dream album)

See also
Tornado (disambiguation)